Ischnodemus sallei is a species of true bug in the family Blissidae. It is found in the Caribbean Sea, Central America, North America, and South America. Ischnodemus fulvipes has been determined to be a taxonomic synonym of Ischnodemus sallei.

References

Blissidae
Articles created by Qbugbot
Insects described in 1773
Taxa named by Charles De Geer